Blount County is a county located in the East Tennessee Grand Division of the U.S. state of Tennessee. As of the 2020 census, its population was 135,280. The county seat is Maryville, which is also the county's largest city. Blount County is included in the Knoxville, Tennessee metropolitan statistical area.

History
What is today Blount County was for many thousands of years Indian territory, passed down to the Cherokee tribe that claimed the land upon the arrival of White settlers in the late 18th century. Shortly thereafter, on July 11, 1795, Blount County became the 10th county established in Tennessee, when the Territorial Legislature voted to split adjacent Knox and Jefferson Counties. The new county was named for the governor of the Southwest Territory, William Blount, and its county seat, Maryville, was named for his wife Mary Grainger Blount. This establishment, however, did little to settle the differences between White immigrants and Cherokee natives, which was, for the most part, not accomplished until an 1819 treaty.

Like a majority of East Tennessee counties, Blount County was opposed to secession on the eve of the Civil War.  In Tennessee's Ordinance of Secession referendum on June 8, 1861, Blount Countians voted against secession by a margin of 1,766 to 414.  Residents of pro-Union Cades Cove and pro-Confederate Hazel Creek (on the other side of the mountains in North Carolina) regularly launched raids against one another during the war.

Throughout its history, the boundaries of Blount County have been altered numerous times, most notably in 1870, when a large swath of western Blount was split into Loudon and portions of other counties. Also, the establishment of the Great Smoky Mountains National Park in 1936, while not affecting the legal boundaries of Blount County, has significantly impacted the use of southeastern Blount County.

Blount County has been served by The Daily Times, currently published in Maryville, since 1883.

On July 2, 2015, a freight train carrying hazardous materials derailed. About 5,000 residents were displaced from their homes within a two-mile (three-kilometer) radius.

Geography

The southern part of Blount County is part of the Great Smoky Mountains, and is protected by the Great Smoky Mountains National Park.  The crest of the range forms the county's border with Swain County, North Carolina, and includes Blount's highest point,  Thunderhead Mountain, and the  Gregory Bald, a prominent grassy bald.  The northern part of the county is part of the Ridge-and-Valley Appalachians. The geologic boundary between the Blue Ridge (which includes the Smokies) and Ridge-and-Valley provinces runs along Chilhowee Mountain, a long and narrow ridge that stretches across the central part of the county. Much of Blount's topography is characterized by elongate ridges and rolling hills— known locally as "The Foothills"— which emanate outward from the Smokies range.

The mountainous southern portion of Blount County is dotted by relatively isolated valleys known as Appalachian coves. The best known of these valleys, Cades Cove, is one of the most visited sections of the national park, and is noted for the remnants of the Appalachian community that occupied the cove prior to the park's formation, as well as an abundance of wildlife, especially white-tailed deer. Tuckaleechee Cove is occupied by the city of Townsend, and Millers Cove is occupied by the community of Walland.

The Tennessee River forms part of Blount's border with Knox County to the northwest.  This section of the Tennessee is part of Fort Loudoun Lake, an artificial lake created by the Tennessee Valley Authority.  The Little Tennessee River, a tributary of the Tennessee, forms part of Blount's southern border with Monroe County, and includes three artificial lakes: Tellico, Chilhowee, and Calderwood (two others, Cheoah and Fontana, are located just upstream in North Carolina). Little River, another tributary of the Tennessee, flows northward from deep within the Smokies and traverses the central part of the county.  The river's confluence with its Middle Prong forms a popular swimming area known as the "Townsend Wye", which is located just inside the park south of Townsend.

Geographical features
Great Smoky Mountains
Chilhowee Mountain
Thunderhead Mountain
Gregory Bald
Lake in the Sky
Look Rock
Fort Loudoun Lake
Chilhowee Lake
Little River
Little Tennessee River

Adjacent counties
Knox County, Tennessee - north
Sevier County, Tennessee - east
Swain County, North Carolina - southeast
Graham County, North Carolina - south
Monroe County, Tennessee - southwest
Loudon County, Tennessee - west

National protected areas
 Appalachian Trail (part)
 Foothills Parkway (part)
 Great Smoky Mountains National Park (part)

State protected areas
 Foothills Wildlife Management Area
 Sam Houston Schoolhouse (state historic site)
 Kyker Bottoms Refuge
 Tellico Lake Wildlife Management Area (part)
 Whites Mill Refuge

Demographics

2020 census

As of the 2020 United States census, 135,280 people, 50,813 households, and 35,299 families were residing in the county.

2000 census
As of the census of 2000,  105,823 people, 42,667 households, and 30,634 families were residing in the county.  The population density was 190 people per square mile (73/km2).  The 47,059 housing units had an average density of 84 per square mile (33/km2).  The racial makeup of the county was 94.73% White, 2.91% Black, 0.29% Native American, 0.72% Asian, 0.37% from other races, and 0.99% from two or more races.  About 1.06% of the population were Hispanics or Latinos of any race.

Of the 42,667 households, 30.5% had children under 18 living with them, 58.4% were married couples living together, 10.0% had a female householder with no husband present, 28.2% were not families, and 1,384 were unmarried partner households: 1,147 heterosexual, 107 same-sex male, 130 same-sex female. About 24.4% of all households were made up of individuals, and 9.5% had someone living alone who was 65 or older.  The average household size was 2.43, and the average family size was 2.88.

In the county, the age distribution was 22.8% under 18, 8.30% from 18 to 24, 29.40% from 25 to 44, 25.40% from 45 to 64, and 14.10% who were 65 or older.  The median age was 38 years. For every 100 females, there were 93.80 males.  For every 100 females 18 and over, there were 90.80 males.   As verified by 2000 U.S. Census, for every 100 females under 65, there were 98.7 males, for every 100 females under 55 there were 99.5 males, and for every 100 females under 20 there were 105 males.

The median income for a household in the county was $37,862, and for a family was $45,038. Males had a median income of $31,877 versus $23,007 for females. The per capita income for the county was $19,416.  About 7.3% of families and 9.7% of the population were below the poverty line, including 12.3% of those under age 18 and 9.1% of those 65 or over.

Government

Like most of East Tennessee, Blount County has been a Republican bastion for decades. The last non-Republican to carry the county was Theodore Roosevelt, during his third-party run in 1912. As a measure of how Republican Blount County is, Franklin D. Roosevelt lost the county by large margins in all four of his successful campaigns, and Barry Goldwater carried it in 1964 by one of his largest margins in the state. Democrats have only come close to winning here twice in recent memory. In 1976, Jimmy Carter took 46% of the vote. In 1992, George H. W. Bush was held to 48.9% of the vote—the only time in over a century that a Republican has failed to win a majority in Blount County.

The current elected members of the Blount County government are:
Commissioners:

Economy
Most of the early European-American settlers were of little means; they were subsistence farmers throughout the early years of the county's establishment. The first industry to make its mark on Blount County, as in other neighboring counties, was that of lumber.

It was the massive development of this industry in the mountains of east Blount that, in part, led to the creation of the Great Smoky Mountains National Park. It includes the southeastern portion of the county. Today, manufacturing has replaced lumber in importance, with over 100 manufacturing plants located in the county.

Denso Manufacturing Tennessee Inc., a division of  Denso Global, is the county's largest employer, with about 3,000 employees.

Education

Public schools in Blount County are part of the Blount County Schools system, with the exception of schools in the cities of Maryville and Alcoa, both of which operate separate, independent school systems.  Private schools located in the county include Maryville Christian School and Clayton-Bradley STEM school.

Blount County is home to two postsecondary educational institutions: Maryville College, a Presbyterian-related, liberal-arts college, founded in 1819 in downtown Maryville, and a satellite campus of Knoxville-based Pellissippi State Community College, referred to as Pellissippi State Community College, or PSCC, Blount County Campus.

Transportation

Paratransit
Blount County is served by the East Tennessee Human Resource Agency's Public Transit system. ETHRA operates in about 16 counties in eastern Tennessee, and is headquartered in the nearby city of Loudon. The service offers residents of any of the counties covered by ETHRA door-to-door pickup transportation across its service area by request only. ETHRA provides a large variety of services in Blount County and other parts of East Tennessee.

Airports
TYS - McGhee Tyson Airport

Highways
Interstate highways
Interstate 140 (Pellissippi Parkway)
U.S. highways
US Route 129 (Airport Hwy, Alcoa Hwy, Hwy 411 South and Calderwood Hwy)
US Route 321 (Lamar Alexander Pkwy and Wears Valley Road)
US Route 411 (Broadway Ave and Sevierville Road)
US Route 441 (Chapman Highway)
State highways
Tennessee State Route 33 (Old Knoxville Hwy, Broadway Ave and Hwy 411 South)
Tennessee State Route 35 (Sevierville Road, Washington Street and North Hall Road)
Tennessee State Route 72
Tennessee State Route 73 (Lamar Alexander Pkwy & Wears Valley Road)
Tennessee State Route 115 (Airport Hwy, Alcoa Hwy, Hwy 411 South and Calderwood Hwy)
Tennessee State Route 162 (Pellissippi Parkway)
Secondary Routes
Tennessee State Route 71 (Chapman Highway)
Tennessee State Route 73 Scenic (Lamar Alexander Pkwy and Little River Road)
Tennessee State Route 333 (Topside Road, Louisville Road, Quarry Rd and Miser Station Road)
Tennessee State Route 334 (Louisville Road)
Tennessee State Route 335 (William Blount Drive, Hunt Road and Old Glory Road)
Tennessee State Route 336 (Montvale Road, Six Mile Road and Brick Mill Road)
Tennessee State Route 429 (Airbase Road)
Tennessee State Route 446 (Foothills Mall Drive)
Tennessee State Route 447
US Park Service Roads
Foothills Parkway
Little River Road
Laurel Creek Road
Cades Cove Loop Road

Parks
In addition to the federally operated Great Smoky Mountains National Park, which draws many visitors to the county each year, Blount County operates numerous smaller community parks and recreation centers, primarily in the cities of Alcoa and Maryville. Some of these facilities include: 
 
Amerine Park (Maryville)
Bassell Courts (Alcoa)
Bicentennial Greenbelt Park (Maryville)
Eagleton Park (Maryville)
Everett Athletic Complex (Maryville)
Everett Park/Everett Senior Center (Maryville)
Howe Street Park (Alcoa)
Martin Luther King, Jr. Community Center (Alcoa)
Louisville Point Park (Louisville)
Oldfield Mini Park (Alcoa)
Pearson Springs Park (Maryville)
Pole Climbers Athletic Fields (Alcoa)
Rock Garden Park (Alcoa)
Sandy Springs Park (Maryville)
John Sevier Park/Pool (Maryville)
Springbrook Park/Pool (Alcoa)
Richard Williams Park (Alcoa)

An integral part of keeping the parks and other parts of Blount County beautiful is the organization called Keep Blount Beautiful. This organization works in coordination with other companies including The City of Alcoa Residential Recycling Pick Up Service and Blount County HGS Trash and Recycling Same Day Residential Pick Up Service, as well as many other recycling resources in Blount County, to work towards the community goals of reducing air, water, and land pollution in order to reduce particulate matter and smog, and to improve the overall health of local parks and preserved ecosystems in Blount County, as well as surrounding areas, of East Tennessee. These organizations and companies are appreciated by thousands of East Tennesseans due to their honorable work in the Blount County community.

Communities

Cities
Alcoa
Friendsville
Maryville (county seat)
Rockford
Townsend

Towns
Louisville
Vonore (partial)

Census-designated places
 Eagleton Village 
 Seymour (partial)
 Walland 
 Wildwood

Unincorporated communities

 Armona
 Disco
 Fairfield
 Happy Valley
 Old Glory
 Tallassee
 Top of the World

Former communities
Cades Cove
Calderwood
Tremont

See also
Great Smoky Mountains Heritage Center
National Register of Historic Places listings in Blount County, Tennessee
Blount County Rescue Squad

References

Further reading
Inez Burns (1995). History of Blount County, Tennessee. Windmill Publications.

External links

Official site
Blount County Chamber of Commerce
TNGenWeb
Blount County on FamilySearch Wiki – genealogical resources
Tennessee Department of Transportation Map of Blount County
The Daily Times
Blount County Fire Department

Blount County Keep Blount Beautiful Organization

 
1795 establishments in the Southwest Territory
Populated places established in 1795
Knoxville metropolitan area
Counties of Appalachia
Second Amendment sanctuaries in Tennessee
East Tennessee